Radoceras is an extinct genus of prehistoric nautiloids from the Paleozoic included in the order Discosorida

References

 Paleobiology db -Radoceras
 Sepkoski, J.J. Jr. 2002. A compendium of fossil marine animal genera. D.J. Jablonski & M.L. Foote (eds.). Bulletins of American Paleontology 363: 1–560. 

Prehistoric nautiloid genera
Discosorida